Samica may refer to:
 Samica (periodical)
 Samica (musical instrument)